The following television stations operate on virtual channel 52 in the United States:

 K15HQ-D in Sayre, Oklahoma
 K20NJ-D in Elk City, Oklahoma
 K27IG-D in Cortez, etc., Colorado
 K27JO-D in Strong City, Oklahoma
 K28OX-D in Weatherford, Oklahoma
 K31JW-D in Elk City, Oklahoma
 K35LF-D in Eureka, California
 KDAS-LD in Santa Rosa, California
 KDTS-LD in San Francisco, California
 KFWD in Fort Worth, Texas
 KPXH-LD in Fort Collins, Colorado
 KSBI in Oklahoma City, Oklahoma
 KVEA in Corona, California
 KZHD-LD in Rohnert Park, California
 W23DM-D in Falmouth, Kentucky
 WGGN-TV in Sandusky, Ohio
 WGVK in Kalamazoo, Michigan
 WHLV-TV in Cocoa, Florida
 WKON in Owenton, Kentucky
 WNJT in Trenton, New Jersey
 WNYI in Ithaca, New York
 WRFB in Carolina, Puerto Rico
 WWRS-TV in Mayville, Wisconsin

The following stations, which are no longer licensed, formerly operated on virtual channel 52 in the U.S.:
 K30MI-D in Redding, California
 WBTD-LD in Suffolk, Virginia
 WMSY-TV in Marion, Virginia

References

52 virtual